The greater long-fingered bat (Miniopterus inflatus) is a species in the family Miniopteridae. It is found in Cameroon, Central African Republic, Democratic Republic of the Congo, Equatorial Guinea, Ethiopia, Gabon, Guinea, Kenya, Liberia, Mozambique, Namibia, Rwanda, Tanzania, Uganda, and Zimbabwe. It roosts in caves.

References

Miniopteridae
Taxonomy articles created by Polbot
Taxa named by Oldfield Thomas
Mammals described in 1903
Bats of Africa